North Carolina's 18th Senate district is one of 50 districts in the North Carolina Senate. It has been represented by Democrat Mary Wills Bode since 2023.

Geography
Since 2023, the district has covered all of Granville County, as well as part of Wake County. The district overlaps with the 7th, 32nd, 35th, 40th, and 66th state house districts.

District officeholders since 1973

Election results

2022

2020

2018

2016

2014

2012

2010

2008

2006

2004

2002

2000

References

North Carolina Senate districts
Granville County, North Carolina
Wake County, North Carolina